The Adults is a "collaborative name" used for two different recording projects led by New Zealand musician and Shihad frontman Jon Toogood. The first iteration of the Adults was a New Zealand rock supergroup that released a self-titled album in 2011. In 2018 a completely different set of musicians (other than Toogood) performed on Haja, an album that blended Aghani Al-Banat (a Sudanese style that translates to "girls' music" and is performed at weddings) with New Zealand hip hop.

New Zealand supergroup, 2010–12 

Beginning as a solo project of Jon Toogood's, the original Adults involved many established New Zealand musicians, including Shayne Carter, Julia Deans, Anika Moa, Tiki Taane and Ladi6. Album The Adults was released in 2011 and reached number four in the New Zealand album charts. It was nominated for Album of the Year at the 2012 New Zealand Music Awards, and the single "Anniversary Day" was on the long list for the 2012 APRA Silver Scroll award.
 
In June 2012 The Adults performed a concert with the Christchurch Symphony Orchestra at CBS Arena in Christchurch, New Zealand. A special edition of their album The Adults with live tracks from the concert was released in November 2012.

Haja, 2014–2018 

The 2018 album Haja was released as The Adults in order to secure the participation of Warner Music after the recordings were made. Over the four years it took to create the album, Toogood had not had the name in mind.

In 2014 Toogood married Dana Salih in Khartoum, the capital of her home country, Sudan. The traditional three-day ceremony included a dance performed by the bride on the final day. Other than the groom, only women are involved as spectators, drummers (the only instruments played) and singers. Women also write all the music and lyrics. The style is called Aghani al-banat, "girl's music", and is usually only performed live.

The wedding was Toogood's first encounter with Aghani al-banat, and in particular the famous performer Gisma. As he explained it, "It sounded amazing, thrilling, like some new MIA track I've never heard... Given Islamic laws it felt kind of subversive. ... I couldn't hide my enthusiasm. [The band] stuck around after the wedding and I told them wanted to record with them. I'm not sure they believed me - then a year later I turned up."

Haja combined iPhone recordings made in Sudan in 2015 (the more formal recording sessions didn't yield anything usable) with basslines played by Toogood and vocal contributions from New Zealand hip hop artists including Chelsea Jade, Raiza Biza and Aaradhna. In keeping with the spirit of Aghani al-banat, Toogood invited mostly female collaborators. He originally didn't plan to sing any vocals of his own, but negotiations with Warner Music led to him being heard on two songs.

In 2018 Toogood wrote an academic paper about the project. Entitled Haja: Incorporating Aghani Al-Banat into a Western Popular Music Recording Project, which formed part of his study towards a Master of Fine Arts.

Members 

 Jon Toogood (Shihad)

The Adults, 2011 
 Tiki Taane (Salmonella Dub)
 Julia Deans (Fur Patrol)
 Shayne Carter (Straitjacket Fits, Dimmer)
 Ladi6
 Anika Moa
 Gary Sullivan (JPS Experience, The Stereo Bus)
 Nick Roughan (The Skeptics)
 Riki Gooch (TrinityRoots, Fat Freddy's Drop)
 Warren Maxwell (TrinityRoots, Fat Freddy's Drop, Little Bushman)
 Steve Bremner (Rhian Sheehan)
 Ruban Nielson (The Mint Chicks, Unknown Mortal Orchestra)
 Kody Nielson (The Mint Chicks, Opossum)
 Redford Grenell

Haja, 2018

Sudan 
 Gisma

New Zealand 
 Devin Abrams
 Estère
 Chelsea Jade
 Aaradhna
 Miloux
 Kings
 Raiza Biza
 JessB

Discography

Albums

Singles

Awards

References

External links 
 The Adults
 The Adults Wiki

New Zealand pop rock groups
Rock music supergroups
Musical groups established in 2010
2010 establishments in New Zealand